Out of Print is the fourth album from punk rock band The Forgotten. It is their second release under BYO Records.

Track listing

Personnel 
Gordy Carbone – Lead vocals
Craig Fairbaugh – Guitar, Vocals
Ken Helwig – Bass Guitar, Vocals tracks 1–14
Gabe Gossack – Bass Guitar, Vocals tracks 15–18
Shea Roberts – Drums tracks 1–6
Todd Loomis – Drums tracks 7–14
Dave Kashka – Drums tracks 15–18

Production
Lars Frederiksen – Producer tracks 1–6
The Forgotten – Producer tracks 7–18
Brett Tyson – Engineer, tracks 1–6
Robert Berry – Engineer, tracks 8–18

References

2003 albums
The Forgotten (band) albums